The iSmell is a commercial application of digital scent technology. Personal Scent Synthesizer developed by DigiScents Inc. was a small device that can be connected to a computer through a Universal serial bus (USB) port and powered using any ordinary electrical outlet. The appearance of the device is similar to that of a shark’s fin, with many holes lining the “fin” to release the various scents. Using a cartridge similar to a printer’s, it can synthesize and even create new smells from certain combinations of other scents. These newly created odors can be used to closely replicate common natural and man-made odors. The cartridges used also need to be swapped every so often once the scents inside are used up. Once partnered with websites and interactive media, the scents can be activated either automatically once a website is opened or manually. However, the product is no longer on the market and never generated substantial sales. Digiscent had plans for the iSmell to have several versions but did not progress past the prototype stage. The company did not last long and filed for bankruptcy a short time after.

In 2006, PC World Magazine commented that "[f]ew products literally stink, but this one did--or at least it would have, had it progressed beyond the prototype stage."

Digiscent

Company Start 
In 1999, Joel Lloyd Bellenson and Dexter Smith, on vacation in Miami, began to think about how to store and reproduce the smells that they had experienced on the beach. They first worked to create a database of smells and then they created the device that would connect to the PC, the iSmell. Their idea was considered to be somewhat profitable, as they had raised “$20 million investments by major investors” such as Givaudan, the largest perfumes and essences company and Real Networks, a provider of streaming services.

Bankruptcy 
The iSmell lacked not in technological capability but in marketing success. DigiScents has shut down due to a lack of funding, although it still “continues to license its technology and is looking for funding for a relaunch.

Product design 
The iSmell was designed to be easy to set up and use, a simple USB port and a cable to be plugged into an ordinary electrical outlet. Digiscents collected thousands of smells based on their chemical makeup and their spot on the spectrum of smells. Each combination of chemicals was then assigned to a small file that represented that specific mixture of ingredients. The file is then embedded into a website, email, or computer program. The user triggers the smell by clicking on the file or opening an email. When the file is opened, that file is sent to the Digiscent and the iSmell will emit the correct combination and amount of chemicals to replicate the requested smell.

Prototype 

The original prototype was a black box that was 5 inches deep, 2 inches wide, and 3 inches tall. The device would contain a cartridge which held a set amount of smells. When activated, a fan will start sucking in air through the rear end, and blowing it over tiny vials of oil, being selectively heated based on the desired chemical combination. The air picks up the smell and is sent out of a 2-inch vent, then into your nose.

Breakdown of iSmell

Chemicals used to create smells 
The main points that the article talks about with the technical break down it discusses the idea that the system that is involved in the actual product is very similar to a printer where there are cartridges within the actual product and that there are 128 chemicals that are stored and they are from usually natural oil and other fragrances. Simonharrop2 writes, “Unlike a printing system which basically just needs Cyan, Magenta, Yellow, and Black, any system to recreate more than one or two basic aroma compounds with any degree of fidelity, would have to have reservoirs or cartridges of hundreds of different base aroma chemicals…".

Dispensing of chemicals into air to create smell 
The way the iSmell dispenses the chemicals into the air is very similar to a Febreze dispenser where it releases the chemicals and the chemicals dissolve in the air. In the article “How Internet Odors Will Work” it describes the process of how the aromas are dispensed into the air, “ A user requests or triggers the file by clicking a mouse or opening an e-mail, A small amount of the aroma is emitted by the device in the direct vicinity of the user”.

Design of dispensers and chemical banks 
The design of the dispenser is basically “shaped like a shark's fin, and it will be connected to your PC through a serial or universal serial bus (USB) port. It can be plugged into any ordinary electrical outlet."

Integration 
The iSmell was also designed for use inside games and movies. The modular design of the iSmell allows a programmer to integrate smell activation files that will trigger the release of any smell or combination that they desire. If the user were to watch a movie with the digiscent files embedded, the user can smell the surroundings of each scene. Imagine the smell of fresh cut grass on rolling hills or the smell of burgers on the grill while watching a cooking show. Or in video games, in a racing game, burning rubber, and in an action game, gunpowder.

Similar products in development
FeelReal is a multisensory mask that attaches to VR headset that releases smells (255 available), vibrates, and blasts user's face with air ("wind" via micro-coolers and "heat" via micro-heaters) or water mist, the company is currently crowdfunding.

See also
 Digital scent technology
 Smell-O-Vision
 Odorama
 Scentography

References

External links 
 DigiScents - A Revolution of the Senses archived on the Internet Archive (June 1, 2001)

Olfaction